Zinat Ara (born 15 March 1953) is a Bangladeshi justice of the Appellate Division.

Early life and education 
Ara was born on 15 March 1953. Her father's name is H.M.R. Siddiqui and mother's name is Begum Ayesha Siddiqui. She passed her LLB and LLM from University of Dhaka.

Career 
Ara was elevated as additional judge of the High Court Division on 27 April 2003 and appointed judge on 27 April 2005. In 2007, 1st time in the history of the country's judiciary, Justice Zinat Ara and Justice Farah Mahbub  the 2 female judges had conducted a division bench of the High Court in order to deliver justice to the people.

References

External links 
 Judges' List: High Court Division  Name and Short Biography

Living people
1953 births
University of Dhaka alumni
Bangladeshi women judges
Supreme Court of Bangladesh justices